International Association for Safety and Survival Training (also IASST) is an international organisation with the goal of improving efficiency of safety and survival training to save lives of seafarers. IASST was founded in 1980. IASST has over 150 members in more than 50 countries.

Members 
Example of members include 

 Alandica Shipping Academy, ASA, Åland, Finland
 ASK Safety, Norway
 CEPS, France
 Maritime Instituut Willem Barentsz, Netherlands
 Maritime Safety & Survival Training LLC, USA
 Maritime Safety and Survival Training Centre, Iceland
 N2M Consulting Inc., Canada
 Novikontas Maritime Collage, Latvia
 OPEANS NIGERIA Limited, Nigeria
 Regional Medical Office, Russia
 Sribima Marine Training Centre, Malaysia
 Survival Systems, Canada

Yearly conference 
The yearly conference has been organised by

 2021 Alandica Shipping Academy, Åland, Finland 
 2019 ASK Safety, Ålesund, Norway 
 2018 Maritime Instituut Willem Barentsz, Netherlands
 2014 NOSEFO, Bergen, Norway

External links 

 IASST-website
IASST on Facebook
IASST on LinkedIn

References 

International non-profit organizations